Psyche is a genus of moths in the family Psychidae (bagworm moths).

Species

Former species
Psyche assamica Watt, 1898
Psyche breviserrata (Sieder, 1963)
Psyche careyi Macalister, 1870
Psyche chilensis Philippi, 1860
Psyche danieli (Sieder, 1958)
Psyche luteipalpis Walker, 1870
Psyche nigrimanus (Walker, 1870)
Psyche niphonica (Hori, 1926)
Psyche norvegica (Heylaerts, 1882)
Psyche plumifera Ochsenheimer, 1810
Psyche takahashii Sonan, 1935
Psyche ussuriensis (Kozhanchikov, 1956)

References

Psychidae
Psychidae genera